The Comprehensive Pneumology Center (CPC) is a translational centre for lung research in Munich, Germany.

Structure
The CPC is located on the campus of the Ludwig Maximilian University of Munich in Munich and is an amalgamation of Helmholtz Zentrum München, LMU, the Hospital of the University of Munich, and the Asklepios Clinics Gauting. The CPC is also one of five DZL (German Center for Lung Research) sites, initiated by the BMBF (Federal Ministry of Education and Research) DZG (German Health Research Centres) facilities.

On 12 July 2010 the Federal Research Minister Annette Schavan and the Bavarian Science Minister Wolfgang Heubisch opened the Lung Research Center [1].

The CPC is headed by a scientific director Prof. Oliver Eickelberg, MD and a clinical director Prof. Jürgen Behr, MD.

Mission

The objectives of the CPC are to find new approaches to early detection, diagnosis and treatment of chronic lung diseases and to develop them. In order to translate the latest experimentally obtained findings of basic research into medical practice, the CPC adopts a translational approaches.

References

[1] Annette Schavan and Wolfgang Heubisch at the opening ceremony of the Comprehensive Pneumology Center (CPC)

External links 
 Comprehensive Pneumology Center

Ludwig Maximilian University of Munich
Medical research institutes in Germany
Research institutes in Munich